Alde Swarte Molen (English: Old Black Mill) is a Hollow Post mill in Easterlittens, Friesland, Netherlands which has been restored to working order. The mill is listed as a Rijksmonument, number 8531.

History
Alde Swarte Molen probably dates from the 17th century. It was built to drain the Frankena Polder. Alde Swarte Molen worked until 1961 when the mill lost a sail in a storm. After this an electric motor took over the work of the mill. On 2 October 1967, the mill was sold to the Gemeente Baarderadeel for ƒ1. In 1969, the mill was restored by millwright De Roos of Leeuwarden. In 1981, a further restoration saw the replacement of the windshaft, sails and Archimedes' screw. In 1984, the mill passed to the Gemeente Littenseradiel in a reorganisation of local government in Friesland.

Description

Alde Swarte Molen is what the Dutch describe as a "Spinnenkopmolen". It is a hollow post mill on a single storey roundhouse. The roundhouse is tiled with pantiles and the body is covered in vertical boards. The mill is winded by tailpole and winch. The sails are Common sails. The sails are carried on a wooden windshaft. The windshaft also carries the brake wheel which has 34 cogs. This drives the wallower (19 cogs) at  the top of the upright shaft. At the bottom of the upright shaft, the crown wheel, which has 28 cogs drives a gearwheel with 27 cogs on the axle of the wooden Archimedes' screw. The screw is inclined at 25½°. Each revolution of the screw lifts  of water.

References

Windmills in Friesland
Hollow post mills in the Netherlands
Windpumps in the Netherlands
Rijksmonuments in Friesland